Harmanli Municipality is a municipality in Haskovo Province, Bulgaria. The administrative centre is Harmanli.

Settlements 
The municipality consists of 1 town (Harmanli) and 24 villages:

Demography

Religion 
According to the latest Bulgarian census of 2011, the religious composition, among those who answered the optional question on religious identification, was the following:

References 

Municipalities in Haskovo Province